A serotonin antagonist, or serotonin receptor antagonist, is a drug used to inhibit the action at serotonin (5-HT) receptors.

Types

5-HT2A antagonists
Antagonists of the 5-HT2A receptor are sometimes used as atypical antipsychotics (contrast with typical antipsychotics, which are purely dopamine antagonists). 

They include, but are not limited to:

 Cyproheptadine blocks 5-HT2A, H1 and is a mild anticholinergic.
 Methysergide is a 5-HT2A antagonist and nonselective 5-HT1 receptor blocker. It causes retroperitoneal fibrosis and mediastinal fibrosis.
 Quetiapine blocks 5-HT2A, 5-HT1A, dopamine receptors D1 and D2, histamine receptor H1, and A1 adrenoreceptors.

5-HT2A/2C antagonists 
 Ketanserin Antihypertensive. Blocks 5-HT2A, 5-HT2C and Alpha 1 (A1) adrenoreceptors.
 Risperidone antipsychotic
 Trazodone
 Nefazodone

5-HT3 antagonists
Another subclass consists of drugs selectively acting at the 5-HT3 receptors, and thus are known as 5-HT3 antagonists.  They are efficacious in treating chemotherapy-induced emesis and postoperative nausea and vomiting. 

They include, but are not limited to:

 Dolasetron
 Granisetron
 Ondansetron
 Palonosetron
 Tropisetron

Other 5-HT3 antagonists have been considered for use in the treatment of irritable bowel syndrome:

 Alosetron
 Cilansetron

Also, the antidepressant mirtazapine acts as a 5-HT3 antagonist.

Non-selective 5-HT antagonists
Although some non-selective serotonin antagonists may have a particular affinity for a specific 5-HT receptor (and thus may be listed below e.g., methysergide), they still may also possess a generalised non-selective action. 

They include, but are not limited to:

 Chlorpromazine
 Cyproheptadine
 Metergoline
 Methysergide
 Mianserin
 Mirtazapine
 Oxetorone
 Pizotifen
 Propranolol
 Ritanserin
 Spiperone

Antihistamines with antiserotonergic activity
 Carbinoxamine
 Cyproheptadine
 Hydroxyzine
 Methdilazine
 Pizotifen
 Promethazine
 Pizotifen is a 5-HT2C antagonist, H1 blocker and anticholinergic useful in migraine prophylaxis. Also used in the treatment of migrane.
 Oxatomide
 Oxetorone Also used in the treatment of migrane.
 Ketotifen

Others
 Fenclonine (para-chlorophenylalanine; PCPA) An inhibitor of serotonin synthesis that has been used in the treatment of carcinoid syndrome.
 Feverfew Is a herb traditionally used for migraines (contains parthenolide).
 Reserpine Depletes serotonin stores in the brain, heart, and many other organs and has been used in hypertension and psychosis
 Gamma-mangostin from Garcinia mangostana

See also
 Serotonin receptor agonist

References

External links